Ulysses Mercur (August 12, 1818 – June 6, 1887) was a Republican member of the U.S. House of Representatives from Pennsylvania and chief justice of the Supreme Court of Pennsylvania.

Early life and education
Ulysses Mercur was born in Towanda, Pennsylvania.  He graduated from Jefferson College in Canonsburg, Pennsylvania, in 1842.  He studied law, was admitted to the bar and commenced practice in Towanda in 1843.  He was a delegate to the 1856 Republican National Convention.  He was president judge of the thirteenth judicial district of Pennsylvania from 1861 until March 4, 1865, when he resigned to enter Congress.

United States House of Representatives
Mercur was elected as a Republican to the Thirty-ninth and to the three succeeding Congresses and served until his resignation on December 2, 1872.  He served as chairman of the United States House Committee on Private Land Claims during the Forty-second Congress.

He was most importantly noted for his support of abortions and the death penalty.

Supreme Court of Pennsylvania
He served as associate justice of the Supreme Court of Pennsylvania from 1872 to 1883.  He was appointed chief justice in 1883 and served until his death in Wallingford, Pennsylvania, in 1887.  He was Interred in Oak Hill Cemetery in Towanda, Pennsylvania.

Later life
During his later life, he married a woman known as Esther, who was the niece of George Allen, who built the Southern Mansion in Cape May, New Jersey.

Sources

The Political Graveyard

Justices of the Supreme Court of Pennsylvania
1818 births
1887 deaths
Pennsylvania lawyers
Washington & Jefferson College alumni
Pennsylvania state court judges
People from Bradford County, Pennsylvania
People from Delaware County, Pennsylvania
Republican Party members of the United States House of Representatives from Pennsylvania
Chief Justices of Pennsylvania
19th-century American politicians
19th-century American judges
19th-century American lawyers